Norbert Siedler (born 29 December 1982 in Wildschönau) is an Austrian racing driver.

Career
Siedler began his career in motorsport in karts. In 1992 he began at the age of ten years in the German Kartszene and in 1997, won the junior class. In 1999, he was an Austrian kart driver. In 2000, he moved into Formula Ford and won in Germany and Austria as well as the championship. In 2001 he drove in the German Formula Three Championship. For the team Palfinger he finished 4th place twice, including once at Hockenheim supporting the German Grand Prix. In 2002, he was sixth in the championship and finished the season with a victory in the last race at Hockenheim. This was followed by three years in the Italian Euro Formula 3000 Championship. In 2005,he won the championship after two victories in eight races overall standings.

In 2003, he traveled to Vallelunga for a Formula One test with Minardi. In 2007 he drove for Kruse Motorsport in the LMP2 class in the Le Mans Endurance Series finishing fifth place at Monza. He made his debut in the Le Mans 24 Hours, again in a Kruse Motorsport Pescarolo-Judd, ending with an engine failure after 98 laps.

Towards the end of the 2007 season, Siedler joined ADM Motorsport in the new racing series International Formula Master.  Siedler began his career in the series with victory at Porto and Anderstorp.

Since 2008 Norbert Siedler has run in the Porsche Supercup.

Racing record

Complete 24 Hours of Le Mans results

Complete Porsche Supercup results
(key) (Races in bold indicate pole position) (Races in italics indicate fastest lap)

External links

1982 births
Living people
Austrian racing drivers
International Formula Master drivers
24 Hours of Le Mans drivers
Atlantic Championship drivers
German Formula Three Championship drivers
Auto GP drivers
Formula Ford drivers
European Le Mans Series drivers
Porsche Supercup drivers
24 Hours of Daytona drivers
Rolex Sports Car Series drivers
ADAC GT Masters drivers
WeatherTech SportsCar Championship drivers
Blancpain Endurance Series drivers
24 Hours of Spa drivers
British GT Championship drivers
International GT Open drivers
Emil Frey Racing drivers
Walter Lechner Racing drivers
RC Motorsport drivers
Euronova Racing drivers
Nürburgring 24 Hours drivers
Lamborghini Squadra Corse drivers
24H Series drivers
Porsche Carrera Cup Germany drivers